The Gibson Les Paul bass is a bass guitar first manufactured by Gibson in 1969, just after the relaunch of the Les Paul guitar in 1968.

History 

The first model simply called "Les Paul Bass", had a few interesting features, most notably low impedance circuitry, especially designed for recording in the studio. It had a Honduras mahogany body with a three-piece mahogany set neck with 24 frets, and a 30 1/2" scale. Besides volume and tone control it had a number of tone-shaping switches (passive circuitry) and two oval humbuckers.

The original Les Paul Bass turned out to be a flop, and in 1971 the model was redesigned and renamed Les Paul Triumph. This model had built-in switching to change from low to high impedance, but was, in essence, much the same, using the same woods and construction.

A hollow body version was created in 1973, named the Les Paul Signature bass. This was a long scale bass (34½") with double cutaways. Very different from the preceding models, but still bearing the Les Paul name.

In 1979 all Les Paul Bass models were discontinued.

In the early 1990s Gibson concentrated on their classic designs, and decided to give the Les Paul bass another chance. Offerings included flattop versions (Deluxe and Special) and a carved-top Standard model. Les Paul basses were available as 4 or 5-string models. The first 1990s version of the Standard model featured Bartolini electronics and pickups. This version is easily recognized by its lack of a pickup selector switch.

The Les Paul Standard bass available from 1997 until 2006 featured a carved maple top over a chambered body for reduced weight. It was equipped with the very high output TB Plus humbucking pickups with ceramic magnets on a three-way pickup selector switch and switchable to passive electronics.

In 2011, the Gibson Les Paul Bass Oversized was released. The difference from the Les Paul Standard Bass is that it has a larger body and stoptail with tune-o-matic bridge.

At NAMM 2019 Gibson introduced a Les Paul Junior double-cut single pickup bass with a 30.5” scale and three-point bridge as fitted to the  company’s SG bass. It appeared in four ‘worn’ nitrocellulose solid body colours with a maple neck and rosewood fingerboard and large black three-ply pickguard.  It also features lightweight tuning keys. Its mahogany slab body closely resembles that of the 1959-1961 double cut EB-0 from which the new bass supposedly draws its inspiration but it is not a ‘reissue’ instrument.  Unlike its ancestor the new bass has its  ceramic twin- coil pickup mid-way between the neck and bridge which can be used in humbucker or single-coil mode via a push/pull volume knob.

See also
 Gibson EB-0/Gibson EB-3 (predecessor)
 Gibson EB-2 (precursor of Signature Bass)
 Gibson Les Paul Standard (design origin of Standard Bass)

References

Gibson electric bass guitars